Dimitar Milanov Stoyanov (18 October 1928 – 1995) was a Bulgarian international footballer who played as a right winger.

Club career
Born in Sofia, Milanov began his career at Botev Sofia, before moving to Septemvri Sofia. In 1948 he joined CSKA Sofia. With CSKA Milanov won 10 A Group titles and three Bulgarian Cups, and became two times top scorer of the league.

International career
Milanov earned 39 caps for the Bulgarian national team, scoring 19 goals, between 1948 and 1959, and he competed at the 1952 Summer Olympics and 1956 Summer Olympics.

Manager career
He coached Marek Dupnitsa and Hebar Pazardzhik.

Honours

Club
CSKA Sofia
 A Group (10): 1948, 1951, 1952, 1954, 1955, 1956, 1957, 1958, 1958–59, 1959–60
 Bulgarian Cup (3): 1951, 1954, 1955

Individual
 A Group top scorer (2): 1948–49 (11 goals), 1951 (13 goals)

References

1928 births
1995 deaths
Footballers from Sofia
Bulgarian footballers
Bulgaria international footballers
FC Septemvri Sofia players
PFC CSKA Sofia players
First Professional Football League (Bulgaria) players
Olympic footballers of Bulgaria
Footballers at the 1952 Summer Olympics
Footballers at the 1956 Summer Olympics
Olympic medalists in football
Bulgarian football managers
PFC Hebar Pazardzhik managers
Olympic bronze medalists for Bulgaria
Association football forwards
Medalists at the 1956 Summer Olympics